The Adelococcaceae are a family of fungi in the order Verrucariales. Species are mostly found in north temperate regions, and are biotrophic or necrotrophic on lichens. The family was proposed by mycologist Dagmar Triebel in 1993.

Genera
 Adelococcus  – 4 spp.
 Pseudopyrenidium  – 2 spp.
 Sagediopsis  – 11 spp.

References

Verrucariales
Ascomycota families
Taxa described in 1993
Lichenicolous fungi
Taxa named by Dagmar Triebel